Kentucky Route 30 (KY 30) is an east–west state highway in Kentucky managed by the Kentucky Transportation Cabinet.

It goes through Laurel, Jackson, Owsley, Breathitt, Magoffin Counties.

Route description
KY 30 begins at an intersection with the Hal Rogers Parkway in London, and goes north as a divided highway until it becomes an undivided two-lane highway about a mile up the road. The road is a recently constructed standard highway with 11ft wide lanes and shoulders on both sides of the road, with a speed limit of 55mph. The road continues through Greenmount into Jackson County. The road then goes through the hilly terrain of Jackson County, and runs past Annville and reaches US 421 at Tyner. At this point, the road is no longer a standard highway and runs as a concurrency to the northern part of Tyner, where it goes east towards Mummie. The road runs a very curvy route and reaches Owsley County where it continues to be curvy until it reaches another newly constructed standard highway at Travellers Rest, which continues past Vincent into Levi where the road intersects with KY 11. From here, the road follows a concurrent route with KY 11 into Booneville and heads west towards Breathitt County. From here, the road curves and goes into the town of Jackson where it then goes on another curvy route into Magoffin County where it meets its eastern terminus in Salyersville.

New alignment
Work has been done to improve the route of KY 30, to establish it as a corridor between London and the impoverished areas the road currently runs through. Beginning in 2003, KY 30 has been realigned on a ~7 mile segment between London and Greenmount, where construction stalled until 2010 when a ~15 mile segment was completed between Greenmount and Annville, where construction stalled again. In 2014, a ~5 mile segment was completed between Annville and Tyner. In a separate segment, a new ~7 mile alignment was constructed in Owsley County between Levi and Travellers Rest. It is estimated that the road will be completely connected as a new highway between Laurel, Jackson and Owsley Counties by 2022. Another development for the corridor may be under way for KY 11 between Levi and Beattyville to connect the realigned segment to another standard highway, to connect Lee, Powell, and Wolfe Counties to this new corridor that leads to London in Laurel County.

Major intersections

References

External links
 Kentucky Route 30 Study Report

0030
0030
0030
0030
0030
0030